The 2015 Club Season started in May 2015 and went through until August 2015. Competitions are held for open women’s and open men’s teams. There is also a schools competition. The winner of the men's competition qualifies for the National Club championship.

Results

Men's open

Semi finals

5th/6th play off

3rd/4th play off

Final

Women's open

Schools competition
The XX Schools’ Championships were held at Sydney Olympic Park Sports Halls on April 29 (girls) and April 30 (boys), 2015. Many schools participated from across Sydney and Wollongong and all teams improved over the course of each day, with some great handball displays from the seasoned competitors through to the teams who had never played until the tournament.

References

 Men's results - NSWHB
 Women's results - NSWHB

Handball competitions in Australia
2015 in Australian sport
2015–16 domestic handball leagues